Verkhnyaya Vodyanka is a rural locality (a selo) and the administrative center of Verkhnevodyanskoye Rural Settlement, Staropoltavsky District, Volgograd Oblast, Russia. The population was 594 as of 2010. There are 10 streets.

Geography 
Verkhnyaya Vodyanka is located in steppe, on Transvolga, 56 km southeast of Staraya Poltavka (the district's administrative centre) by road. Pervomaysky is the nearest rural locality.

References 

Rural localities in Staropoltavsky District